Pakistan participated at the 2010 Summer Youth Olympics in Singapore

Medalists

Field hockey

Swimming

Taekwondo

Weightlifting

References

External links
Competitors List: Pakistan

2010 in Pakistani sport
Nations at the 2010 Summer Youth Olympics
Pakistan at the Youth Olympics